The Èvre is a  long river in western France, left tributary of the Loire.

The Èvre flows through the following communes in the Maine-et-Loire département, ordered from source to mouth: Vezins, La Tourlandry, Trémentines, Le May-sur-Èvre, La Jubaudière, Jallais, La Poitevinière, Beaupréau, La Chapelle-du-Genêt, Le Fief-Sauvin, Montrevault, Saint-Pierre-Montlimart, Saint-Rémy-en-Mauges, La Boissière-sur-Èvre, La Chapelle-Saint-Florent, Botz-en-Mauges, Saint-Florent-le-Vieil, Le Marillais

References

Rivers of France
Rivers of Pays de la Loire
Rivers of Maine-et-Loire